Naebu Expressway is a highway located in Seoul, South Korea. It is part of Seoul City Route C3. The inner loop runs concurrently with Gangbyeon Expressway for 18.33 km and Dongbu Expressway for 2.04 km.

History
This route was established on 31 October 1995 서울특별시공고 제1995-265호, 1995년 10월 31일.

Stopovers

 Seoul
 Mapo District - Seodaemun District - Jongno District - Seongbuk District - Dongdaemun District - Seongdong District

List of Facilities 
 IC : 나들목(Interchange)
 JC : 분기점(Junction)
 TR : 터널(Tunnel)
 (■): Motorway section

References

External links 
 Riding Naebu Expressway
 MOLIT South Korean Government Transport Department

1995 establishments in South Korea
Roads in Seoul